Antheraea brunei is a moth of the family Saturniidae first described by Michael G. Allen and Jeremy Daniel Holloway in 1986. It is found in Borneo and Palawan.

References

Antheraea
Moths of Asia
Moths described in 1986